Musical is the adjective of music.

Musical may also refer to:
 Musical theatre, a performance art that combines songs, spoken dialogue, acting and dance
 Musical film and television, a genre of film and television that incorporates into the narrative songs sung by the characters
 MusicAL, an Albanian television channel
 Musical isomorphism, the canonical isomorphism between the tangent and cotangent bundles

See also
 Lists of musicals
 Music (disambiguation)
 Musica (disambiguation)
 Musicality, the ability to perceive music or to create music